Shula Eta Marks, OBE, FBA (born 14 October 1938, in Cape Town) is emeritus professor of history at the School of Oriental and African Studies of the University of London.  She has written at least seven books and a WHO monograph on Health and Apartheid, concerning experiences and public health issues in South Africa.  Some of her current public health work involves the fight against the spread of HIV/AIDS in contemporary South Africa.

She was born Shula Eta Winokur in Cape Town and educated at the University of Cape Town (BA) and the University of London (PhD).  She also holds three honorary doctorates.  She is married to Professor Isaac Marks, emeritus professor at King's College London. She has two children: Lara, a historian of medicine, and Raphael, an architect.

Career 
 Lecturer in the history of Africa, Institute of Commonwealth Studies and SOAS (jointly) 1963-1976
 Reader in the history of Southern Africa, 1976–84; Professor of Commonwealth history 1984-93 and Director, 1983-1993, Institute of Commonwealth Studies
 Hon DLitt, University of Cape Town, 1994
 Hon DSocSci, University of Natal, 1996
 Professor of history of Southern Africa SOAS 1993-2001 (professor emeritus 2001-, honorary fellow 2005) 
 Douglas Southall Freeman professor, University of Richmond 2005
 Hon DLitt et Phil, University of Johannesburg, 2012

Other positions and honours 
 Consultant, World Health Organization, 1977-1980
 President, African Studies Association of the UK (ASAUK), 1978-1979
 Chair, World University Southern African Scholarships Committee, 1981-1992
 Council Society for Protection of Science and Learning (now Council for Assisting Refugee Academics (CARA)), 1983-2013 (chair 1993-2004)
 Governor, Institute of Development Studies, University of Sussex, 1988-1991
 Chair, The International Records Management Trust, 1989-2004
 Advisory Council on Public Records, 1989-1994
 Governing Body Queen Elizabeth House Oxford, 1991-1994
 Commonwealth Scholarships Commission, 1992-1998
 Fellow of the British Academy (FBA), 1995 
 OBE, 1996
 7th Annual Bindoff lecture, "Rewriting South African history, or, The hunt for Hintsa's head", Queen Mary and Westfield College (University of London), delivered 12 March 1996
 Humanities Research Board 1997-98, a Non-Departmental Government Body of the British Research Council
 Arts and Humanities Research Council (AHRB), 1998-2000
 Vice-president, Royal African Society, 1999-
 Distinguished Africanist Award, African Studies Association of the UK, 2002
 Trustee, Council Member, Canon Collins Educational & Legal Assistance Trust, 2004-2014

Publications 
 Reluctant Rebellion: An Assessment of the 1906-08 Disturbance in Natal (1970)
 Economy and Society in Preindustrial South Africa (Edited jointly with Anthony Atmore, 1980)
 Industrialisation and Social Change in South Africa: African class formation, culture, and consciousness, 1870-1930 (Edited jointly with Richard Rathbone, 1982), Longman, London and New York, 383 pages
 WHO monograph on Health and Apartheid, co-authored, 1983 
 Ambiguities of Dependence in South Africa: Class, Nationalism and the State in Twentieth Century Natal (1986)
 The Politics of Race, Class and Nationalism in Twentieth Century South Africa (Edited jointly with Stanley Trapido, 1987)
 Not Either an Experimental Doll: The Separate Worlds of Three South African Women (1987) 
 Divided Sisterhood: Race Class and Nationalism in the South African Nursing Profession (1994)

See also
 KwaZulu-Natal
 Natal Province

References

Sources
 Who's Who 2006
 Debrett's People of Today 2006
 Amazon Author page for Shula Marks

1938 births
Living people
Fellows of the British Academy
South African Jews
British Jews
British historians
Jewish historians
Officers of the Order of the British Empire
University of Cape Town alumni
Alumni of the University of London
Academics of SOAS University of London
Writers from Cape Town
South African emigrants to the United Kingdom
Academics of the University of London
Academics of the Institute of Commonwealth Studies, London
Presidents of the African Studies Association of the United Kingdom